Polyploviricotina is a subphylum of viruses in the phylum Negarnaviricota. It is one of only two virus subphyla, the other being Haploviricotina, which is also in Negarnaviricota.

References

External links
 Invasion of the Body Snatchers: Viruses Can Steal Our Genetic Code to Create New Human-Virus Genes; on: SciTechDaily, Source: Mount Sinai School of Medicine; August 9, 2020
 Jessica Sook Yuin Ho, Matthew Angel, Yixuan Ma, Jonathan W. Yewdell, Edward Hutchinson, Ivan Marazzi, et al.: Hybrid Gene Origination Creates Human-Virus Chimeric Proteins during Infection; in: Cell Volume 181, Issue 7; June 18, 2020; doi:10.1016/j.cell.2020.05.035
 Yixuan Ma, Matthew Angel, Guojun Wang, Jessica Sook Yuin Ho, Nan Zhao, Justine Noel, Natasha Moshkina, et al.: Discovery of UFO Proteins: Human-Virus Chimeric Proteins Generated During Influenza Virus Infection; on: bioRxiv; April 8, 2019; doi:10.1101/597617

Negarnaviricota
Virus subphyla